Reverend Michael Peet who died on 9 April 2011 was a founder member of the Lesbian and Gay Christian Movement and was the Rector at Bow Church for 22 years.

He wrote Seven Parishioners of Stratford Bow and was involved in the plans for the 700th anniversary of Bow Church.

References

Date of birth missing
2011 deaths
English Anglicans